Primoco UAV is an unmanned aerial vehicle (UAV) for civilian use, designed and manufactured in the Czech Republic. Its first flight took place in July 2015 and the UAV Model One 100 started full production in January 2016.

Its primary usage is in civilian air operations, supporting applications ranging from border protection and security to pipeline monitoring and remote infrastructure management. The aircraft has a fixed wing construction, providing extended range and reliability in adverse weather conditions.

Operation and Control

The UAVis operated from a Ground Control Station with a pilot and a flight operator. It can be manually controlled or run in fully automatic mode, where pre-programmed waypoints allow automatic takeoff, flight and landing. The aircraft also has additional safety modes which allow it to return to base or land in a safe area if communications are lost or faults occur. 

The UAV has an S mode transponder which allow its flight path to be integrated into normal civilian airspace without special authorization. The equipment and aircraft can be transported in a light van..

Communications and Monitoring
Secure communications via radio or satellite Inmarsat connections are built in for continuous transmission of video and sensor readings to a ground station. Onboard sensors include Infra-Red cameras, Optical cameras, Radar/Lidar and others to the operator’s requirements.

Technical specifications

 Crew: 0
 Wingspan: 4.9 m
 Length: 3.7 m
 Maximum take-off weight: 100/150 kg
 Single piston engine 20/50 hp
 Composite construction
 Cruise speed: 100 – 150 km/h
 Maximum Distance: 1,500 km
 Endurance: 10 hours
 Payload: 1 – 50 kg
 Take-off/Landing length: 300 m

Equipment

 Optical cameras
 Infra-Red cameras
 Lidar 
 Multispectral/hyperspectral camera
 On board S Mode Transponder
 12/24V accessory power
 Encrypted communications (Radio or Inmarsat)

References

External links
 

Unmanned aerial vehicles of the Czech Republic